Zeynalabad or Zainulabad or Zeyn ol Abad may refer to:
 Zeynalabad, Fars
 Zeynalabad, Kerman
 Zeynalabad-e Damdari Salman, Kerman Province
 Zeynalabad, Sistan and Baluchestan
 Zeynalabad, Sarbisheh, South Khorasan Province